= Caroline Gemmer =

English children's writer (1820–1909)

Caroline Gemmer (1820–1909) was an English children's writer. Under the name Gerda Fay, she published Poetry for Play Hours (1860) and Lyrics and Idylls (1861). She then published Children of the Sun: Poems for the Young (1869), Babyland, or Pretty Rhymes for the Little Ones (1877) and Fidelis and Other Poems (1897) under her own name. She was a long-time friend and correspondent of Christina Rosetti. Gemmer was an anti-vivisection campaigner and published poems in the RSPCA magazine Animal World.
